Only People may refer to:

 Only People (song), 1973 John Lennon song
 Only People (film), 1957 Yugoslav film